Alec Woodall (20 September 1918 – 3 January 2011) was a British Labour Party politician.

Woodall was the Member of Parliament (MP) for Hemsworth from 1974 until 1987, when he was deselected as Labour candidate and replaced by George Buckley who described him as being from "traditional mining stock" in his maiden speech.

Before entering Parliament, Woodall served as an infantryman.

Political views 
Woodall supported a range of political causes during his time in the House of Commons, including more transparency in political funding in the United Kingdom.

References
 
 The Times Guide to the House of Commons, Times Newspapers Ltd, 1983 & 1987
 

1918 births
Labour Party (UK) MPs for English constituencies
National Union of Mineworkers-sponsored MPs
UK MPs 1974
UK MPs 1974–1979
UK MPs 1979–1983
UK MPs 1983–1987
2011 deaths
British Army soldiers